Pentila glagoessa, the immaculate cream pentila, is a butterfly in the family Lycaenidae. It is found in eastern and southern Nigeria, Cameroon, Gabon, the Democratic Republic of the Congo (Haut-Uele, Tshopo, Equateur and Sankuru) and Uganda. The habitat consists of forests.

Adults resemble day-flying cream moths.

References

Butterflies described in 1893
Poritiinae
Butterflies of Africa